Stefanus Johannes "Faan" Rautenbach (born 22 February 1976) is a former rugby union footballer who played at prop for London Irish,  and the .

Rautenbach played 14 Tests for the Springboks including a try on debut against Wales in 2002, ending with his last Test against New Zealand in Christchurch in 2004. Rautenbach is known as a powerful scrummager.

References

External links
London Irish profile

South African rugby union players
South Africa international rugby union players
London Irish players
1976 births
Living people
Western Province (rugby union) players
Stormers players
Golden Lions players
Lions (United Rugby Championship) players
South African expatriate rugby union players
Expatriate rugby union players in England
South African expatriate sportspeople in England
White South African people
Rugby union players from the Free State (province)
Rugby union props